The one-baht coin is a denomination coin of the Thai baht, the Thai currency unit. 

Like all coins in Thailand, its obverse features the King of Thailand, Vajiralongkorn, and previously Bhumibol Adulyadej. The newest set of coins features King Vajiralongkorn's royal monogram on the reverse side while the coins of the previous set featured Wat Phra Sri Rattana Satsadaram or Wat Phra Kaew, the royal temple in Bangkok's Grand Palace complex. 

It is commonly called rian baht (Thai:เหรียญบาท) by Thai speakers (rian meaning "coin" in Thai).

Series

2009 changes 
On February 2, 2009, the Treasury Department announced changes to several circulating coins. The composition of the one-baht coin changed from cupronickel to nickel-clad iron, reducing the mass from 3.4 grams to 3.0 grams. The obverse image has also been updated to a more recent portrait of the king.

2018 series 
The Ministry of Finance announced on March 28, 2018 that the first coins featuring the portrait of His Majesty King Maha Vajiralongkorn Bodindradebayavarangkun will be put in circulation on April 6.

Mintages 
 1986 ~ 4,200,000
 1987 ~ 329,471,000
 1988 ~ 391,442,000
 1989 ~ 466,684,000
 1990 ~ 409,924,000
 1991 ~ 329,946,380
 1992 ~ 426,230,000
 1993 ~ 235,623,000
 1994 ~ 475,200,000
 1995 ~ 589,394,650
 1996 ~ 98,487,000
 1997 ~ 350,660,600
 1998 ~ 176,932,000
 1999 ~ 224,389,000
 2000 ~ 427,589,000
 2001 ~ 393,460,000
 2002 ~ 269,375,000
 2003 ~ 280,691,000
 2004 ~ 562,018,000
 2005 ~ 1,470,538,000
 2006 ~ 749,861,000
 2007 ~ 618,918,316
 2008 (old series) ~ 562,532,000
 2008 (new series) ~ 180,900,000
 2009 ~ 246,000,000

Commemorative issues 
 Commemoration of King Bhumibol Adulyadej and the Queen Sirikit return from the World visit.
 The 3rd Cycle Birthday of King Bhumibol Adulyadej.
 The 5th Asian Games.
 The 6th Asian Games.
 Commemorative of the Food and Agriculture Organisation FAO (1972).
 Commemoration of HRH Crown Prince Vajiralongkorn.
 The 25th Anniversary of World Health Organisation WHO.
 The 8th SEAP Games.
 The 75th Anniversary of Princess Mother Srinagarindra.
 Commemorative of the Food and Agriculture Organisation FAO (1977).
 Commemoration of Princess Sirindhorn graduated from Chulalongkorn University.
 Commemoration of HRH Princess Sirindhorn.
 The 8th Asian Games.
 Commemoration of the World Food Day.
 The 50th Anniversary Celebrations of the King Bhumibol Adulyadej's Accession.

References

See also
 Baht bus
 Thai baht

Coins of Thailand
One-base-unit coins